Stygobromus mundus, commonly called Bath County cave amphipod, is a troglomorphic species of amphipod in family Crangonyctidae. It is endemic to Bath County, Virginia in the United States.

References

Freshwater crustaceans of North America
Cave crustaceans
Crustaceans described in 1967
mundus
Endemic fauna of Virginia